Fractures of the acetabulum occur when the head of the femur is driven into the pelvis. This injury is caused by a blow to either the side or front of the knee and often occurs as a dashboard injury accompanied by a fracture of the femur.

The acetabulum is a cavity situated on the outer surface of the hip bone, also called the coxal bone or innominate bone. It is made up of three bones, the ilium, ischium, and pubis. Together, the acetabulum and the head of the femur form the hip joint.

Fractures of the acetabulum in young individuals usually result from a high energy injury like vehicular accident or feet first fall. In older individuals or those with osteoporosis, a trivial fall may result in acetabular fracture.

In 1964, French surgeons Robertt Judet, Jean Judet, and Emile Letournel first described the mechanism, classification, and treatment of acetabular fracture. They classified these fractures into elementary (simple two part) and associated (complex three or more part) fractures.

Judet-Letournel classification

Presentation

Associated injuries and complications
The broken bone pieces or the dislocated head of the femur may injure the sciatic nerve, causing paralysis of the foot; the patient may or may not recover sensation in the foot, depending on the extent of injury to the nerve. The posterior wall fragment may be one large piece, or multiple pieces, and may be associated with impaction of the bone. Sciatic nerve injury and stoppage of blood supply to the femoral head at the time of accident or during surgery to treat the injury may occur. Deep vein thrombosis and pulmonary embolism are other complications that may occur in any type of injury to the acetabulum. A common postoperative complication is heterotopic ossification around the injured hip joint.

Anatomy
To understand the fracture pattern of a fractured acetabulum, it is essential to have minimum three x-ray views, though use of CT scan with 3-D reconstruction of images has made understanding of these fractures easier.
 Pelvis with both hips antero posterior view. This view shows six important landmarks of the acetabulum, specifically:
 Pelvic brim
 Ilio ischial line
 Tear drop
 Anterior wall
 Posterior wall
 Weight bearing dome
 Iliac oblique view. This view shows the whole of the ilium, the posterior column, and the anterior wall
 Obturator oblique view. Shows the anterior column and the posterior wall.

Patterns of fracture
Tile's classification of acetabular fracture:
 I - Simple fracture, anterior or posterior wall column
 II - Transverse fracture
 III - T - Type fracture involving two columns
 IV - Both columns fractures, floating acetabulum

Diagnosis
Ideal x-ray visualization of an elementary fracture will depend on the fracture type:
 Posterior wall fracture: Iliac oblique and obturator oblique views
 Posterior column fracture: Iliac oblique and obturator oblique views
 Anterior wall fracture: Iliac oblique view
 Anterior column fracture: Obturator oblique view
In all cases, CT scan can assist in identifying impacted bone pieces, which may be found within the joint, and MRI may be done to identify the extent of potential injury to the sciatic nerve.

Treatment
If the femur head is dislocated, it should be reduced as soon as possible, to prevent damage to its blood supply. This is preferably done under anaesthesia, following which, leg is kept pulled by applying traction to prevent joint from dislocating.

The final management depends on the size of the fragment(s), stability and congruence of the joint. In some cases traction for six to eight weeks may be the only treatment required; however, surgical fixation using screw(s) and plate(s) may be required if the injury is more complex. The latter treatment will be called for if bone fragments do not fall into place, or if they are found in the joint, or if the joint itself is unstable.

Post-surgery
Depending on the stability achieved via initial treatment, the patient may be allowed to stand and walk with help of support within about six to eight weeks. Full function may return in about three months.

Principles of management
At the site of injury: After stabilizing an injured person and resuscitation, quick examination is done to check injury to vital organs.

If one suspects injury to the hip, it is imperative to immobilise the limb using some kind of support to prevent movements of the injured limb to prevent further damage

A trained paramedic may be able to diagnose hip dislocation by noticing the position of the injured limb. It is essential to document status of nerves and vessels before starting any treatment to protect oneself from litigation

On arrival at the hospital, trained trauma surgeon will assess the patient and prescribe necessary tests including x-rays as described earlier.

Non-surgical management consists of reducing the dislocated joint by maneuver under anaesthesia and applying traction to the limb to maintain position of joint and fractured bones. If non surgical management is preferred it may require six weeks to 3 months for recovery.

Surgical management
The surgical management requires high degree of training and well equipped centre. It should be carried out by experienced surgical team to get best results. The principles laid down for management are;
 Anatomic reduction of the fractured fragments
 Stable fixation
 Congruent joint
 Early mobilization
 Delayed weight bearing
Innominate bone is a flat bone with many curves. In most part the bone is thick enough and has broad surfaces that are amenable to primary fixation using lag screw(s) and to neutralize forces across the bone one needs to add plate(s) on the surface of the fractured fragments for it to heal without deformity.

Before surgery, patient needs tests to check fitness for surgery

Anaesthesia : the surgery may be performed either under regional anaesthesia or general anaesthesia

Surgical approaches. Following are the common approaches;
 Kocher Langenbeck approach for posterior injuries
 Ili inguinal, Ilio femoral of modified stoppa's approach for anterior or combined injuries
Implants : normally lag screws and reconstruction plates are preferred implants

Post operative management: would involve initial period or bed rest, followed by mobilisation by trained therapist

Total time to recover may be up to 3 months

Elderly patients have worse outcomes than other populations. Studies show that over 20 percent will require subsequent total hip arthroplasty.

Gallery

Elementary fractures

Associated fractures

References

External links 

Bone fractures